William Loch Cook (December 6, 1869 – March 5, 1942) was a justice of the Tennessee Supreme Court from 1923 to 1942.

Born in Montgomery County, Tennessee, Cook served in the Tennessee House of Representatives for Dickson County in 1897. In 1908, he was elected to a seat on the Tennessee Ninth Judicial Circuit, where he remained until 1923, when Governor Austin Peay appointed Cook to a seat on the Tennessee Supreme Court vacated by the resignation of Justice D. L. Lansden.

References

1869 births
1942 deaths
People from Montgomery County, Tennessee
Members of the Tennessee House of Representatives
Justices of the Tennessee Supreme Court